The 2005–06 WNBL season was the 26th season of competition since its establishment in 1981. A total of 8 teams contested the league.

Broadcast rights were held by free-to-air network ABC. ABC broadcast one game a week, at 1:00 PM at every standard time in Australia.

Molten provided equipment including the official game ball, with Hoop2Hoop supplying team apparel.

Team standings

Finals

Season award winners

Statistics leaders

References

 https://web.archive.org/web/20141227122005/http://www.wnbl.com.au/fileadmin/user_upload/Media_Guide/12284_BASKAUST_WNBL_MEDIA_GUIDE_2014-15_BACK.pdf

2005-06
2005–06 in Australian basketball
Aus
basketball
basketball